Robert Barth (born 10 August 1968) is a German motorcycle speedway rider who has ridden in Speedway Grand Prix. He has also won four Long Track World Championships, in 2002, 2003, 2005 and 2006.

Speedway Grand Prix results

Career details

World Championships 

 Team World Championship (Speedway World Team Cup and Speedway World Cup)
 2000 - 3rd place in Semi Final B
 2002 -  - 4th place in Event 1

European Championships 

 European Club Champions' Cup
 2000 -  Piła - Bronze medal (10 points)
 2001 -  Daugavpils - 4th place (8 points)

Longtrack World Championships

Individual Final Years

 1991 Semi-final
 1992 Semi-final
 1993 Semi-final
 1994  Marianske Lazne (14th) 4pts
 1995  Scheeßel (13th) 4pts
 1996  Herxheim (Third) 23ptsGrand-Prix Years

 1997 Did not compete
 1998 5 app (Second) 93pts 1999 5 app (Second) 79pts 2000 5 app (Second) 98pts 2001 4 app (Third) 70pts 2002 5 app (Champion) 113pts 2003 6 app (Champion) 131pts2004 2 app (16th) 36pts
 2005 4 app (Champion) 83pts 2006 3 app (Champion) 75ptsBest Grand-Prix Results

  Abingdon First 2000
  Aduard Third 1998
  Berghaupten Second 1999
  Bielefeld First 2003, Third 2002
  Collier Street Second 2001, 2003
  Colomb de Lauzun First 2002
  Eenrum Second 2000, Third 1999
  Herxheim Second 2001
  Marmande First 2005, 1998, Third 2003
  Morizes First 2000, 2002, 2003, 2006, Second 2005, Third 2001, 2004
  Mühldorf First 2003, Second 1998, 1999, 2005
  New Plymouth Third 2003
  Parchim Second 2002, Third 2005
  Pfarrkirchen Third 2004
  Scheeßel First 2002
  St. Macaire First 2006
  Vechta First 2006

German Longtrack Championship

 1994  Vilshofen Champion
 1997  Ludinghausen Third
 1999  Herxheim Champion
 2000  Scheeßel Second
 2001  Berghaupten Champion
 2002  Harsewinkel Second
 2003  Ludinghausen Champion
 2004  Mühldorf 7th
 2005  Bad Hersfeld Champion
 2006  Berghaupten Champion

Grasstrack European ChampionshipsFinalist 1988  Joure (7th) 10pts
 1989  La Reole (Champion) 21Pts 1990  Uithuizen (Champion) 24Pts 1994  Cloppenburg (Champion) 25Pts'''

See also 
 Germany national speedway team
 List of Speedway Grand Prix riders

External links
 http://grasstrackgb.co.uk/robert-barth/

References 

1968 births
Living people
German speedway riders
Individual Speedway Long Track World Championship riders